Stokes-Mayfield House is a historic home located at Rock Hill, South Carolina.  It was built in 1907, and is a two-story, frame residence with cross-gabled slate roof in the Neo-Classical style. The house features a two-story tetrastyle Corinthian order pedimented portico and a balcony with decorative iron brackets above the front door.

It was listed on the National Register of Historic Places in 1984.

References

Houses on the National Register of Historic Places in South Carolina
Neoclassical architecture in South Carolina
Houses completed in 1907
Buildings and structures in Rock Hill, South Carolina
National Register of Historic Places in Rock Hill, South Carolina
Houses in York County, South Carolina